Mihály Lantos (born Mihály Lendenmayer, 29 September 1928 – 31 December 1989) was a Hungarian football player and manager. He played as a defender, spending the majority of his career at MTK Hungária FC. During the 1950s he was also a member of the Hungary team known as the Golden Team. Other members of the team included Nándor Hidegkuti, Ferenc Puskás, Zoltán Czibor, Sándor Kocsis and József Bozsik. After retiring as a player Lantos worked as coach. Between 1965 and 1967 he was assistant coach to his former MTK manager, Márton Bukovi, at Olympiacos. He then returned to Hungary where he managed several teams including Videoton FC.

Club career
MTK Hungária FC
Lantos began playing for MTK in 1948. In 1949 when Hungary became a communist state, MTK were taken over by the secret police, the ÁVH and the club subsequently changed their name several times. Initially they became Textiles SE, then Bástya SE, then Vörös Lobogó SE and then finally back to MTK.  Despite this turmoil, the 1950s proved a successful era for club and under coach Márton Bukovi and with a team that also included Nándor Hidegkuti, Péter Palotás and József Zakariás, MTK and Lantos won three Hungarian League titles, a Hungarian Cup and a Mitropa Cup. In 1955, as Vörös Lobogó SE, they also played in the first ever European Cup. Lantos, scoring three goals, including two penalties, helped the club reach the quarter-finals.

International career
Between 1949 and 1956, Lantos won 52 caps and scored 5 goals for Hungary. He made his international debut on 10 July 1949 in an 8–2 win against Poland. As one of the Mighty Magyars, he helped Hungary become Olympic Champions in 1952, Central European Champions in 1953 and defeat England twice. He scored the opening goal as Hungary beat England 7–1 on 23 May 1954. He then helped Hungary reach the 1954 World Cup final. During the World Cup finals he played all five games for Hungary, scoring in the opening 9–0 win against South Korea and in the bruising Battle of Berne quarter-final encounter against Brazil.

Honours

Club
MTK Hungária FC
Hungarian League (3): 1951, 1953, 1958
Hungarian Cup: 1952
Mitropa Cup: 1955

International
Hungary
Olympic Champions: 1952
Central European Champions: 1953
World Cup Runner-up: 1954

References

External links
 Hungary stats 
 European Cup 1955–56

1928 births
1989 deaths
Footballers from Budapest
Hungarian footballers
MTK Budapest FC players
Hungarian football managers
Hungary international footballers
Footballers at the 1952 Summer Olympics
Olympic footballers of Hungary
Olympic gold medalists for Hungary
1954 FIFA World Cup players
Fehérvár FC managers
Zalaegerszegi TE managers
Olympic medalists in football
Medalists at the 1952 Summer Olympics
Association football defenders